Highway 47 is a highway in the Canadian province of Saskatchewan. It runs from North Dakota Highway 40 at the Canada–United States border until Highway 49 near Preeceville.

History 
Prior to the renumbering of the Yellowhead Highway in 1976, the section of Highway 47 between Springside and Preeceville was known as Highway 314. The northern extension of Highway 47 coincided with the renumbering of Highway 14 between Saskatoon and the Manitoba border to Highway 16.

The section of Highway 47 between Melville and Willowbrook was originally part of Highway 10, which turned east at Willowbrook along present-day Highway 52 to Yorkton. Highway 10 was realigned in the 1960s and the former north-south section became part of Highway 47.

Major intersections 
From south to north:

References 

047
Buchanan, Saskatchewan
Buchanan No. 304, Saskatchewan
Transport in Estevan